William Parker (November 7, 1793 - October 29, 1873) was an American businessman and politician, who served as acting mayor of Boston, Massachusetts in early 1845.

Early life
Parker was one of thirteen children. Parker was the son of Bishop Samuel Parker and Ann (née Culter) Parker.

References

Footnotes

Bibliography
[https://books.google.com/books?id=ZENKAAAAMAAJ&pg=PA308&dq=William+Parker+alderman+boston&as_brr=1 Whitmore, William H.: The Inaugural Addresses of Mayors of Boston Volume] 1. Page 308, (1894).
Sprague, William Buell.: Annals of the American Pulpit: Or, Commemorative Notices of Distinguished American Clergymen of Various Denominations, from the Early Settlement of the Country to the Close of the Year Eighteen Hundred and Fifty-five Pages 296-298, (1859). 
 A Catalogue of the City Councils of Boston, 1822–1908, Roxbury, 1846–1867, Charlestown 1847-1873 and of The Selectmen of Boston, 1634-1822 also of Various Other Town and Municipal officers, Boston, MA: City of Boston Printing Department,  (1909) pp. 44, 53, 88, 301, 374-375, 400.

Mayors of Boston
Massachusetts city council members
1793 births
1873 deaths
19th-century American politicians